Bovistella is a genus of puffball fungi in the family Agaricaceae. The genus was circumscribed by mycologist Andrew Price Morgan in 1892.

Species
, the nomenclatural authority Index Fungorum accepts 20 species in Bovistella:

See also
List of Agaricaceae genera
List of Agaricales genera

References

Agaricaceae
Agaricales genera
Taxa described in 1892